Ivan Mesík (born 1 June 2001) is a Slovak footballer who plays as a centre-back for Italian  club Pescara, and the Slovakia U21 team.

Club career

Spartak Trnava
Mesík made his Fortuna Liga debut for Spartak against Nitra on 18 May 2019. He had played the entire match of the 0:1 away win that was sealed by a goal by David Depetris.  This was Mesík's only appearance in the season.

In the 2019–20 season, Mesík became a regular in the red-black jersey playing in 16 of 18 league rounds. He scored his first league goal against Nitra, in the third round, on 4 Augustu 2019, during a 2:0 home win, after a corner by Marko Tešija. He also scored a goal against a third league side Jednota Bánová in the cup, in a narrow 3:2 win. He also made appearances in the pre-season Czechoslovak Supercup, against Slavia Prague, as a late replacement for Jozef Menich, as well as unsuccessful Europa League qualifying campaign, against both Radnik Bijeljina and Lokomotiv Plovdiv. Overall, by January, Mesík had collected 23 competitive starts and 2 goals for Spartak.

Nordsjælland
On 28 January 2020, it was announced that Mesík was leaving Spartak Trnava, aged only 19 years old. He had signed a five-year deal with Nordsjælland, playing in the Superliga. The club was battling for promotion for the season's championship group at the time of his arrival. He became a second Slovak to feature for the club with Stanislav Lobotka playing there few years before.

On 31 August 2021, Mesík was loaned out to Norwegian club Stabæk Fotball for the rest of 2021.

Pescara
On 5 January 2023, Mesík signed for Serie C club Pescara on a permanent transfer.

International career
On 7 June 2022, Mesík was called up to the Slovak senior team for the first time as an alternate following an injury of newly appointed national team captain Milan Škriniar. Mesík was to be available for two away UEFA Nations League fixtures against Azerbaijan and Kazakhstan on 10 and 13 June 2022. In the initial nomination by Štefan Tarkovič, who was fired from managerial duties on the same day following a home defeat to Kazakhstan on 6 June, Mesík was not even listed as an alternate, and therefore appeared with the Slovakia U21 team in a nomination by Jaroslav Kentoš.

References

External links
 FC Spartak Trnava official profile
 Futbalnet profile
 
 

2001 births
Living people
Sportspeople from Banská Bystrica
Slovak footballers
Slovak expatriate footballers
Slovakia youth international footballers
Slovakia under-21 international footballers
Association football defenders
FK Dukla Banská Bystrica players
FC Spartak Trnava players
FC Nordsjælland players
Stabæk Fotball players
Odds BK players
Delfino Pescara 1936 players
Slovak Super Liga players
Danish Superliga players
Eliteserien players
Expatriate men's footballers in Denmark
Expatriate footballers in Norway
Expatriate footballers in Italy
Slovak expatriate sportspeople in Denmark
Slovak expatriate sportspeople in Norway
Slovak expatriate sportspeople in Italy